Michael Lord is an American songwriter, composer, producer and Indie recording artist. His 2004 release SWAY found an audience when his song Smile was chosen by the Apple iTunes Music Store as their Single of The Week. Other songs from SWAY including "Bleed" and "Forgiven" soon found their way into hit television shows such as Alias and What About Brian. He followed SWAY with a mini EP titled The String Sessions reinterpreting the songs from SWAY acoustically with a string quartet. Lord wrote all string arrangements which were then performed by The Section Quartet.

In 2005 Lord worked with producer Desmond Child to arrange and record songs for American Idol's Season 4 Showstoppers Album resulting in the Recording Industry Association of America (RIAA) Certified Gold Record.

Following the American Idol success he has turned his attention to music production producing tracks for Honey County, Quincy Coleman, Graham Colton,  Courtney Jaye, Dilana, Paulina Gretzky and Chelsea Williams as well as writing songs included in NBC's hit comedy My Name Is Earl.

Currently Lord is composing, producing and arranging music for television, film and media. He recently composed the themes and underscore for NBC's hit game show The Wall hosted by Chris Hardwick.

Biography 
Michael Lord's varied experience and notable collaborations bring him a unique perspective as a composer.

Lord found early success as a member of bands with deals on Atlantic and Island/Def Jam, touring the US, garnering heavy rotation on radio/MTV and Top 20 Billboard chart success. Those experiences opened the door to his collaboration with exceptional producers such as Eric Valentine and T Bone Burnett, with whom he evolved his production chops.

Striking out on his own, Lord's music found an audience when Apple chose his track "Smile" from his self-produced album SWAY as their iTunes Single of Week. This opened the door for numerous placements for his music, including in Alias, Brothers & Sisters, My Name is Earl and Laguna Beach, as well as song arrangement and production opportunities including the Brown Betty musical episode of Fox’s Fringe and the American Idol Showstopper’s album, which was certified Gold by the RIAA.

Lord’s considerable song placements established him as a production music force and led to him co-creating the original music package for A&E’s hit Duck Dynasty, the theme for nationally syndicated entertainment based talk show Hollywood Today Live (Fox/Media General), as well as music for over 200 other shows.

Establishing a footprint in the scripted world, Lord collaborated with actor/director Ricky Schroder to compose a modern Americana score and original songs for Schroder’s film, Our Wild Hearts, as well as Schroder’s US Army project Starting Strong. Lord was then chosen to score various features, including the adaptation of NY Times bestseller Jessica Darling’s It List.

Taking note of Lord’s scoring skills, prominent music producer Jay Ruston enlisted Lord to re-envision a track for metal legends Anthrax on their comeback album, Worship Music. Lord created a hybrid orchestration of metal married to dark, ambient underscore for the bonus track remix version of "The Crawl".

In 2017, Lord joined with prolific television producer Andrew Glassman to compose the themes and underscore for NBC’s game show The Wall, hosted by Chris Hardwick with LeBron James as executive producer. Now entering its third season on NBC, The Wall is a multinational hit format being produced on 6 stages with over 30 international versions in association with Endemol/Shine. Lord's themes/underscore are used in all international versions.

Premiering in June 2019, Lord's themes and underscore will be an integral part of Fox’s game show Spin the Wheel co-created by Andrew Glassman and Justin Timberlake and hosted by Dax Shepard.

A native of Los Angeles, Lord began playing the piano at age 5. He studied classical piano, guitar, drums, and composition. Lord was the recipient of the Chick Corea Jazz Masters Scholarship while he attended the Berklee College of Music.

Filmography 
 The Wall (2016–Present) NBC Network - Composer Main Title Theme and Underscore
 Driven Season 2 (2021) Passionflix - Composer
 Ultimate Cowboy Showdown (2020–Present) INSP Network - Composer
 Spin the Wheel (2019–Present) FOX Network - Composer Main Title Theme and Underscore
 Driven Season 1 (2018) Passionflix - Composer
 Matchmakers Playbook (2018) Passionflix - Composer
 Afterburn-Aftershock (2017) Passionflix - Composer
 Second Chance Christmas (2017) MarVista Entertainment - Composer
 Hollywood Dirt (2017) Passionflix - Composer
 Hollywood Today Live (2016) FOX Television Network - Composer/Main Title Theme
 Jessica Darling's, It List (2016) MarVista Entertainment - Composer
 You Cast A Spell On Me (2015) MarVista Entertainment/ION Television - Composer
 Starting Strong (2014) U.S. Army - Composer/Main Title Theme
 Our Wild Hearts (2013) Hallmark Channel - Composer
 Fringe | Brown Betty, (2010) FOX Television Network - Musical Adaptions/Arrangements
 Expedition Africa (2009) History - Composer/Additional Music

Discography 

Into The Dark - from the Album Berserker - Amon Amarth, (Metal Blade, Sony Music, 2019) - Orchestration
The Crawl - from the EP Anthems - Anthrax, (Megaforce, 2013) - Orchestration
 Back from the Dead - Adler (2012) - musician
First Kiss - Maggie Sajak (AO Recordings, 2012) - producer/composer
Balls Out - Steel Panther (Universal Republic, 2011) – orchestration/musician
Hear Me Out from the EP, Somewhere In Between - Graham Colton (2011) - producer/composer
Behind Blue Eyes - Rob Giles (AO Recordings, 2010) - producer
You Better Go Now - Emily Friendship (AO Recordings, 2010) - producer
Love The One You're With - Jen Stills (AO Recordings, 2009) - producer
Bridge Over Troubled Water - Quincy Coleman (AO Recordings, 2009) - producer
Hangover - Dilana (AO Recordings, 2009) – producer/composer
Running On Faith - Quincy Coleman (AO Recordings, 2009) - producer
These Days - Jen Stills (AO Recordings, 2009) – producer
Don't Stop Believin' - Steel Panther (Universal Republic, 2009) – musician
Feel the Steel - Steel Panther (Universal Republic, 2009) – orchestration/musician
Are You With Me - Courtney Jaye (AO Recordings, 2007) – producer/composer
Who'll Stop the Rain - Courtney Jaye (AO Recordings, 2007) - producer
American Idol Season 4: The Showstoppers (19 Recordings Limited/RCA, 2005) – production/orchestration/musician/programming
SWAY- Michael Lord -  (AO Recordings, 2004) – producer/composer/performer
The String Sessions - Michael Lord -  (AO Recordings, 2004) – producer/composer/performer
 It's About Time - Marc Ford  (Anko Records 2002) - Hammond B3
California - California  (Trauma Records, 2000) – band member/composer
Skin - Tattoo Rodeo (BMG, 1995) – band member/composer
Rode Hard - Put Away Wet - Tattoo Rodeo (Atlantic, 1991) - Band Member (Keyboards, Hammond B3, Vocals) / Composer (Group Credit)

Soundtracks - Film/Television 
 Brothers & Sisters episode "Time After Time" (2010) - with "Behind Blue Eyes" as producer
 Brothers & Sisters episode "A Valued Family" (2010) - with "Love The One You're With" as producer
 Brothers & Sisters episode "Nearlyweds" (2009) - with "These Days" as producer
 Brothers & Sisters episode "Troubled Waters" (2009) - with "Bridge Over Troubled Water" as producer
 Brothers & Sisters episode "The Road Ahead" (2009) - with "Running On Faith" as producer
 South Of Nowhere episode "Better Late Than Never" (2008) - with "Smile" as producer/composer/performer
 Merry Christmas, Drake & Josh (2008) - with "This Christmas" as producer/composer
 The Circuit (2008) - with "Nothing's Left to Lose" as producer/composer
 Stiletto (2008) - with "Broken" as producer
 My Name Is Earl  episode  "Two Balls, Two Strikes" (2007) - with "SRV Jam" as producer/songwriter/performer
 What About Brian episode "What About The Lake House" (2007) - with "Forgiven" as producer/composer/performer
 Paradise City episode "Lions and Cheetahs" (2007) - with "Are You With Me" as producer/composer
 Brothers & Sisters Season Two, Premiere "Home Front" (2007) - with "Who'll Stop The Rain" as producer
 Viva Laughlin Pilot Episode (2007) - with "Easy Crime" as producer/composer
 My Name Is Earl  episode  "Our Other Cops Is On" (2007) - with "Something To Say" as producer/composer/performer
 Laguna Beach: The Real OC episode "Spies, Lies and Alibis" (2006) - with "Sunken In" as producer/composer
 Laguna Beach: The Real OC episode "Who Wants To Date A Rock Star" (2006) - with "Later" as producer/composer
 Laguna Beach: The Real OC episode "It's Like Break Up Season" (2006) - with "Are You With Me" as producer/composer
 Zoey 101 episode "Spring Break Up" (2006) - with "Bleed" as producer/composer/performer
 My Name Is Earl  episode  "Jump For Joy" (2006) - with "GT Girl" as producer/composer/performer
 My Name Is Earl  episode  "Stole P's Hot Dog Cart" (2006) - with "Parade" as producer/composer/performer
 ALIAS episode "Detente" (2005) - with "Holding My Breath" as producer/composer/performer
 Laguna Beach: The Real OC episode "Lies and Goodbyes" (2005) - with "Fly" aka "Collecting Dust" as producer
 Zoey 101 episode "Election" (2005) - with "Smile" as producer/composer/performer
 Zoey 101 episode "Time Capsule" (2005) - with "Spin" as producer/composer/performer
 My Name Is Earl episode  "Broke Joy's Fancy Figurine" (2005) - with "Comes Around" as producer/composer/performer
 My Name Is Earl episode  "Faked My Own Death" (2005) - with "Girls Guns" as producer/composer/performer
 The Sterling Chase aka Graduation Week (1999) - with "Bleed" as producer/composer/performer
 Kate's Addiction (1999) - with "Into the Mystic" as producer/performer; "Stronger" as producer/composer; additional music/end titles theme
 Gone Fishin' (1997) - with "Best Friend" and "What Went Wrong" as composer/performer
 Kid (1990) - with "Restless Heart" as composer

External links
 
 Artist site 
 Composer site 
 Label site

References 

Tune Find Tune Find

American singer-songwriters
Berklee College of Music alumni
Living people
Record producers from California
Year of birth missing (living people)